Evergreen Park is a village in Cook County, Illinois, United States. In 2020, the population was 19,943.

History
As early as 1828, a German farming family had settled in the area of what is now Evergreen Park. In the succeeding decades, other German immigrants arrived. Kedzie Avenue and 95th Street crisscrossed the farmland and provided access to markets.

The first railroad (now the Grand Trunk Railroad) came through the area in 1873. In 1875, the community built its first school just west of 95th and Kedzie. The school and the stores that began to cluster around this intersection defined the community's main business area. Nearby, a real-estate developer, with a vision of the Arc de Triomphe area of Paris, laid out a star-shaped park with eight streets radiating from it. The evergreen trees planted in the park inspired the village's name. The location and layout of the park was intended to be the center of town, but 95th St and Kedzie Ave. later proved a more accurate midpoint.  After the death of Mayor Henry Klein shortly after the village's 75th anniversary, the park was renamed Klein Park in his honor.

In 1888 St. Mary's Cemetery opened, and mourners traveled by train from Chicago. Restaurants and taverns were created to provide meals for cemetery visitors. Within five years, the village had become a recreation center that attracted hundreds of Chicagoans to its picnic groves, beer gardens, and dance halls.  The first of the village's 13 churches was established in 1893.

As a result of the financial panic of the 1890s, several surrounding communities voted to be annexed by Chicago.  Realizing the current and future potential of its strong business district, and in order to avoid annexation during the serious economic crisis, The Village of Evergreen Park declared its independence and was incorporated on December 20, 1893. Prior to its incorporation, the village was sustained by approximately 500 regional residents. The final decision to incorporate as its own entity separate from the City of Chicago was made by a 41 out of 50 approval by village residents.  John M. Foley, a real estate and insurance agent, became the village's first mayor. During the 1890s, The Village of Evergreen Park officially occupied an area of four square miles; it now covers an area of the same size.

In 1899, shortly after its incorporation, the village introduced telephone services to the community.  In 1910, gas and electric lines were extended into homes and street lights were erected.   By 1920, most of the village's homes had indoor plumbing, although some residents still used a well located behind the village hall as their water source.

In the early 20th century, many residents still farmed and there were many open fields within the town limits.  As a result, fire was a constant threat and the water supply was scarce.  In July 1918, a spark from a passing train set the original village hall on fire.  Despite villagers' attempts to douse the flames, the village hall was destroyed.  In 1920, a new village hall was built and the population grew to 800.

In 1930, Little Company of Mary Hospital was opened at 95th and California.  Within the first year of its inception, 232 babies were born.

In 1967, a violent and damaging F4 tornado occurred in Evergreen Park and other nearby suburbs.

While the village remains small in size, it is only seventeen miles southwest of the Loop. The Village is also currently surrounded by Chicago on the north, south, and east sides. Evergreen Park is also known as the "Village of Churches" because of its thirteen established religious congregations within close proximity.

First successful organ transplant 
On June 17, 1950, Little Company of Mary Hospital, located at 2800 W. 95th St. in Evergreen Park, was the site of the world's first successful organ transplant. Dr. Richard Lawler, MD, an exceptional surgeon at Cook County Hospital, led a team of doctors that performed the hazardous and highly controversial operation. In order to prepare for the experimental procedure, Lawler spent several years researching and practicing various organ transplants and used canines as the testing subjects. He concluded through his research that the most probable means of achieving success for organ transplantation would involve a human kidney from a post-mortem donor. Realizing he had the opportunity "get it all started," Lawler decided to attempt the medical first on a chronically ill patient in dire need of a new kidney. The recipient of the first successful organ transplantation was Ruth Tucker, a 44-year-old Chicago-area woman who suffered from terminal polycystic kidney disease.  Tucker amazingly survived for another 5 years. 

Dr. Lawler's pioneering achievement did not escape criticism. He was repudiated by many of his colleagues and criticized by the Catholic church. By the 1970s, with organ transplantation evolving into a widely recognized life-saving necessity, Lawler and his entire team earned the much-deserved respect from the medical community, and their reputation healed.  Dr. Lawler retired in 1979 and died in 1982.

Historical landmarks

Evergreen Plaza, "The Plaza"

The Evergreen Plaza, located on 95th and Western, was an indoor shopping mall originating from the early 1950s. In 1952, real estate developer Arthur Rubloff debuted the Evergreen Plaza in the heart of the southwest Chicago suburbs. A few years after the shopping mall's debut, Rubloff decided to enclose the mall thereby making it the first indoor shopping mall in the Chicago area. As a result, Rubloff changed shopping by allowing people the opportunity to pull up, park, and shop for various goods all in one place. Since the 1950s the Evergreen Park Plaza had seen more than $8 million in major internal & external improvements. Evergreen Plaza was shortened to be acknowledged as, "The Plaza". The Plaza covered , and two stories. As of 2006, The Plaza had an annual visitor count of roughly 7 million people. After 61 years of operation, The Plaza closed for redevelopment on May 31, 2013. The Plaza, in its new form, re-opened on October 18, 2018 and was renamed the Evergreen Marketplace.

Geography
Evergreen Park is located at  (41.719933, −87.702499). The suburb is surrounded by the city of Chicago on three of its sides, while Oak Lawn and Hometown border it on the west. Chicago's Ashburn community is to its north, Beverly is to its east, and Beverly and Mount Greenwood are to its south.

According to the 2021 census gazetteer files, Evergreen Park has a total area of ,all land.

U.S. Route 12 and U.S. Route 20 bisect Evergreen Park as 95th street.

Demographics
As of the 2020 census there were 19,943 people, 7,161 households, and 4,964 families residing in the village. The racial makeup of the village was 57.84% White, 24.49% African American, 0.41% Native American, 1.19% Asian, 0.07% Pacific Islander, 7.87% from other races, and 8.12% from two or more races. Hispanic or Latino of any race were 17.10% of the population.

There were 7,161 households, out of which 54.46% had children under the age of 18 living with them, 49.21% were married couples living together, 14.89% had a female householder with no husband present, and 30.68% were non-families. 28.45% of all households were made up of individuals, and 11.80% had someone living alone who was 65 years of age or older. The average household size was 3.30 and the average family size was 2.67.

The village's age distribution consisted of 23.6% under the age of 18, 7.5% from 18 to 24, 25.4% from 25 to 44, 28.6% from 45 to 64, and 14.8% who were 65 years of age or older. The median age was 41.1 years. For every 100 females, there were 81.6 males. For every 100 females age 18 and over, there were 79.8 males.

The median income for a household in the village was $79,396, and the median income for a family was $97,958. Males had a median income of $61,171 versus $43,148 for females. The per capita income for the village was $35,328. About 4.0% of families and 5.8% of the population were below the poverty line, including 5.9% of those under age 18 and 9.3% of those age 65 or over.

Note: the US Census treats Hispanic/Latino as an ethnic category. This table excludes Latinos from the racial categories and assigns them to a separate category. Hispanics/Latinos can be of any race.

Government and politics
Evergreen Park is in Illinois's 1st congressional district, and its congressman is Democrat Jonathan Jackson. It is also a part of Illinois’s 6th congressional district, represented by Democrat Sean Casten. The village backed Barack Obama by a margin of 61.25% to 37.40% over John McCain in 2008. Evergreen Park leans moderately Democratic as John Kerry beat George W. Bush here 55.77% to 43.40% in 2004. This is slightly more Democratic than in 2000 when Bush lost to Al Gore 51.13% to 45.60% in the village. The most Republican area of the village is the Southwest quadrant which went for Bush both years. (In 2000 Bush won 51.29% to 45.24%, and in 2004, Bush won 49.91% to 49.31%.). 

The current mayor of Evergreen Park is Kelly Burke.

Notable people 

 Tom Baldwin, professional football player, New York Jets
 Chris Chelios, retired NHL and Olympic player, member of Hockey Hall of Fame, born in Evergreen Park
 Tony Cingrani, pitcher for the Los Angeles Dodgers, born in Evergreen Park
 Perry Danos, singer-songwriter in Nashville, attended Southeast, Central, and EPCHS
 Bil Dwyer, comedian and game show host, born in Evergreen Park
 Jenny McCarthy, Playboy playmate, actress, television host, born in Evergreen Park
 Jim Dwyer, outfielder for several Major League Baseball teams, born in Evergreen Park
 Ed Farmer, MLB pitcher (1971–83) and White Sox radio announcer, born and raised in Evergreen Park
 Ruben Gallego, member of the United States House of Representatives from Arizona's 7th congressional district since 2015. Gallego was raised in Evergreen Park and attended Evergreen Park Community High School.
 Rick Gorecki, MLB pitcher, born in Evergreen Park
 Tom Gorzelanny, pitcher for the Washington Nationals, attended Marist High School
 Brad Guzan, soccer player with Atlanta United FC and U.S. international
 Wayne Huizenga, former CEO of Blockbuster; founder of AutoNation, the Florida Marlins, and the Florida Panthers; owner of the Miami Dolphins and Sun Life Stadium; born and raised in Evergreen Park.
 Mahalia Jackson, gospel singer, winner of Grammy Lifetime Achievement Award; died in Evergreen Park
 Ted Kaczynski, notorious figure better known as the Unabomber, graduated from Evergreen Park High School
 Jane Lynch, actress, comedian, and author. Born in Evergreen Park in 1960
 Scott Meyer, catcher for the Oakland Athletics
 Maureen Murphy, chairman of the Cook County Republican Party (2002–04)
 Rasmea Odeh, convicted of immigration fraud, for concealing her arrest, conviction, and imprisonment for fatal terrorist bombing
 Rich Nugent, member of the United States House of Representatives from Florida (2011–2017). He was raised in Evergreen Park.
 Frank M. Ozinga (1914–1987), Illinois state senator and lawyer; born in Evergreen Park
 Donn Pall, pitcher for the Chicago White Sox (1988–98), raised in Evergreen Park
 David Patterson, a computer pioneer and academic, born in Evergreen Park
 Billy Pierce, pitcher, broadcaster and scout for the Chicago White Sox
 Bill Rancic, television personality; born in Evergreen Park
 Lou Pote, MLB pitcher, born in Evergreen Park
 Joe Shanahan, owner of Metro Chicago, born and raised in Evergreen Park 
 Kevin Sullivan, former White House Communications Director, born and raised in Evergreen Park
 Joseph C. Szabo, 12th Administrator of the Federal Railroad Administration (2009–2015). He was born in Evergreen Park.
John Tumpane (born 1983), baseball umpire 
 Mike Wengren, drummer for metal band Disturbed

Schools
It is located within the Evergreen Park Elementary School District 124 and the Evergreen Park Community High School District 231.

Public schools:                                                                                                                                                                           
Northeast Elementary
Northwest Elementary
Southeast Elementary
Southwest Elementary
Central Middle School
Evergreen Park Community High School

Private schools:
Most Holy Redeemer School
Queen of Martyrs

Brother Rice High School, Mother McAuley High School, and St. Rita High School are all private schools located in Chicago in close proximity to Evergreen Park. St. Xavier University also borders Chicago and Evergreen Park.

Notable events
Evergreen Park Little League hosted the 2009 Little League State Championship. The event was broadcast on Comcast.

References

External links
 
 Village of Evergreen Park official website

 
Villages in Illinois
Villages in Cook County, Illinois
Chicago metropolitan area
Populated places established in 1893
1893 establishments in Illinois